Chilia kalos orisate, is a Greeks folkloric tune (syrtos or Kasik Havasi).

Original form

The original form of the syrtos was popular in Icaria.

See also
Syrtos Dance From Bornova (Bournovalios Syrtos)

References

External media
https://soundcloud.com/search?q=Ti%20Tha%20Yino%2C%20Ego%20Me%20Sena%20(%22What%20Shall%20I%20Become%2C%20I%20with%20You%3F%22
http://www.ikariamusicproject.com/images/audio/XiliaKalosorisate.mp3

Turkish music
Turkish songs
Greek music
Greek songs
Year of song unknown
Songwriter unknown